Middle Andaman Island is an island of the Andaman Islands.  It belongs to the North and Middle Andaman administrative district, part of the Indian union territory of Andaman and Nicobar Islands.

Geography
It is the central island of the Great Andaman archipelago of India, with a total area of 1,536 km².
Middle Andaman is separated from North Andaman Island by Austen Strait, and from Baratang Island at the south by Homfray's Strait, both shallow and narrow channels, a few hundred metres wide; and from Interview Island at its west by the navigable Interview Passage.

The island's coastline was inundated by the tsunami resulting from the 26 December 2004 Indian Ocean earthquake, though the effect was far less severe when compared with other Islands of Andaman and Nicobar Islands.

Administration
Politically, Middle Andaman Island, is part of Mayabunder and Rangat Tehsils.

Demographics 
Population of Middle Andaman consists of Bengali, Tamil and Keralite settlers. The island is also home to many of the indigenous Jarawa people. The main occupation of the inhabitants is farming and Agriculture.

Middle Andaman's main towns (Metro population in brackets) are Rangat (10,000), Mayabunder (5,565), Bakultala (4,454), Nimbutala (3,063), and Kadamtala (3,008).

According to the 2011 census of India, the Island has x households. The effective literacy rate (i.e. the literacy rate of population excluding children aged 6 and below) is 76%.

Tourism
The island hosts immaculate waterfalls, and pretty beaches.
Adventurous fun such as Island camping, trekking, Scuba diving, snorkeling, and other exciting water sports offer you chance to indulge in real pleasure.

References 

 Geological Survey of India

 
Islands of North and Middle Andaman district